Karl Litschi (Felben, 27 April 1912 – Andelfingen, 18 March 1999) was a Swiss professional road bicycle racer. He was both a cyclo-cross cyclist and a road race cyclist, become Swiss national champion in both disciplines. In the 1939 Tour de France, he won one stage. In the same year he was the Swiss National Road Race champion.

Major results

1937
 national cyclo-cross champion
Tour de Suisse
1938
Berner Rundfahrt
1939
GP de Cannes
Züri-Metzgete
 national road race champion
Tour de France:
Winner stage 8B
1941
 national road race champion

References

External links 

Swiss male cyclists
1912 births
1999 deaths
Swiss Tour de France stage winners
Cyclo-cross cyclists
Tour de Suisse stage winners
Sportspeople from Thurgau